WRMS-FM (94.3 FM) is a radio station broadcasting a Country music format. Licensed to Beardstown, Illinois, United States.  The station is currently owned by LB Sports Productions LLC.

References

External links

 

Country radio stations in the United States
RMS-FM